Jánské kameny is a mountain in the Lusatian Mountains, on the border of Germany and the Czech Republic.

Mountains of Saxony
Mountains and hills of the Czech Republic
Upper Lusatia